Gol Malek (also known as Galm Malek and Kam Malek) is a village in Qaleh Qazi Rural District, Qaleh Qazi District, Bandar Abbas County, Hormozgan Province, Iran. At the 2006 census, its population was 500, in 100 families.

References 

Populated places in Bandar Abbas County